Peronospora potentillae is a plant pathogen infecting strawberries. It also infects Alchemilla filicaulis.

References

External links

Peronosporales
Water mould strawberry diseases
Species described in 1863